Kanika Tekriwal is an Indian entrepreneur who is serving as Chief executive officer of JetsetGo. She is the youngest richest woman in India. She founded India's first aircraft leasing organization.

Personal life 
She was born in a Marwari family. She owns 10 private jets. She founded JetsetGo in 2012. Her net worth is 420 crore. She studied from Lawrence School, Lovedale and then done her half education from Jawaharlal Nehru Senior Secondary School from Bhopal which is her parent's hometown and graduated from Coventry University. She is self made richest woman in Hurun Rich List. Her company handle 1,00,000 fliers and has operated 6,000 flights. In early 20s, she was diagnosed with cancer.

Awards and honors 

 BBC 100 Women
 Forbes 30 Under 30
 Women Transforming India by United Nations
 National Entrepreneurship Award by Government of India
 Young Global Leaders by World Economic Forum
 Felicitated during an event by Ministry of Civil Aviation, Government of India
 Got title of "The Sky Queen" by Entrepreneur

References 

Year of birth missing (living people)
Indian chief executives
Businesspeople from Bhopal
Businesspeople from Madhya Pradesh
Alumni of Coventry University
BBC 100 Women
Living people